is a genre specific to Japanese works, primarily manga and anime. It is a sub-genre of slice of life, portraying characters living out peaceful lives in calming environments, and is intended to have a healing effect on the audience. The word iyashikei could mean "healing type" or just "healing" in Japanese. Shaenon K Garrity of Otaku USA wrote that in iyashikei works, "the focus is less on character and plot, more on worldbuilding and creating an immersive visual setting".

Origins 
Iyashikei originated in the late 1970s, but it emerged as a distinct subgenre in 1995, in the wake of the Great Hanshin earthquake and the Tokyo subway sarin attack. These traumatic events, combined with the economic recession, would lead to what scholar Paul Roquet calls the iyashi trend, or healing boom. The trauma suffered by the Japanese public provided "the emotional context for the emergence of calm as a lucrative and marketable feeling."

Examples 

 Adachi and Shimamura
 Aria
 Azumanga Daioh
 Bartender
 Boku no Natsuyasumi series
 Flying Witch
 Girls' Last Tour
 Hakumei and Mikochi
 The Helpful Fox Senko-san
 K-On!
 Kiyo in Kyoto
 Kuma Kuma Kuma Bear
 Laid-Back Camp
 Magical Emi, the Magic Star
 Mushishi
 My Neighbor Totoro
 My Roommate Is a Cat
 Natsume's Book of Friends
 Non Non Biyori
 Super Cub
 Tamayura
 Wakakozake
 Yokohama Shopping Log

References 

 
Anime and manga terminology
Anime and manga genres
Japanese culture